The Poienari or Poenari is a right tributary of the river Prahova in Romania. It discharges into the Prahova in Gorgota.

References

Rivers of Romania
Rivers of Prahova County